Opticks: or, A Treatise of the Reflexions, Refractions, Inflexions and Colours of Light is a book by English natural philosopher Isaac Newton that was published in English in 1704 (a scholarly Latin translation appeared in 1706). The book analyzes the fundamental nature of light by means of the refraction of light with prisms and lenses, the diffraction of light by closely spaced sheets of glass, and the behaviour of color mixtures with spectral lights or pigment powders. Opticks was Newton's second major book on physical science and it is considered one of the three major works on optics during the Scientific Revolution (alongside Kepler's Astronomiae Pars Optica and Huygens' Traité de la Lumière). Newton's name did not appear on the title page of the first edition of Opticks.

Overview
The publication of Opticks represented a major contribution to science, different from but in some ways rivalling the Principia. Opticks is largely a record of experiments and the deductions made from them, covering a wide range of topics in what was later to be known as physical optics. That is, this work is not a geometric discussion of catoptrics or dioptrics, the traditional subjects of reflection of light by mirrors of different shapes and the exploration of how light is "bent" as it passes from one medium, such as air, into another, such as water or glass. Rather, the Opticks is a study of the nature of light and colour and the various phenomena of diffraction, which Newton called the "inflexion" of light.

In this book Newton sets forth in full his experiments, first reported to the Royal Society of London in 1672, on dispersion, or the separation of light into a spectrum of its component colours. He demonstrates how the appearance of color arises from selective absorption, reflection, or transmission of the various component parts of the incident light.

The major significance of Newton's work is that it overturned the dogma, attributed to Aristotle or Theophrastus and accepted by scholars in Newton's time, that "pure" light (such as the light attributed to the Sun) is fundamentally white or colourless, and is altered into color by mixture with darkness caused by interactions with matter. Newton showed just the opposite was true: light is composed of different spectral hues (he describes seven — red, orange, yellow, green, blue, indigo and violet), and all colours, including white, are formed by various mixtures of these hues. He demonstrates that color arises from a physical property of light — each hue is refracted at a characteristic angle by a prism or lens — but he clearly states that color is a sensation within the mind and not an inherent property of material objects or of light itself. For example, he demonstrates that a red violet (magenta) color can be mixed by overlapping the red and violet ends of two spectra, although this color does not appear in the spectrum and therefore is not a "color of light". By connecting the red and violet ends of the spectrum, he organised all colours as a color circle that both quantitatively predicts color mixtures and qualitatively describes the perceived similarity among hues.

Newton's contribution to prismatic dispersion was the first to outline multiple-prism arrays. Multiple-prism configurations, as beam expanders, became central to the design of the tunable laser more than 275 years later and set the stage for the development of the multiple-prism dispersion theory.

Opticks and the Principia

Opticks differs in many respects from the Principia. It was first published in English rather than in the Latin used by European philosophers, contributing to the development of a vernacular science literature. The book is a model of popular science exposition: although Newton's English is somewhat dated—he shows a fondness for lengthy sentences with much embedded qualifications—the book can still be easily understood by a modern reader. In contrast, few readers of Newton's time found the Principia accessible or even comprehensible. His formal but flexible style shows colloquialisms and metaphorical word choice.

Unlike the Principia, Opticks is not developed using the geometric convention of propositions proved by deduction from either previous propositions, lemmas or first principles (or axioms). Instead, axioms define the meaning of technical terms or fundamental properties of matter and light, and the stated propositions are demonstrated by means of specific, carefully described experiments. The first sentence of the book declares My Design in this Book is not to explain the Properties of Light by Hypotheses, but to propose and prove them by Reason and Experiments. In an Experimentum crucis or "critical experiment" (Book I, Part II, Theorem ii), Newton showed that the color of light corresponded to its "degree of refrangibility" (angle of refraction), and that this angle cannot be changed by additional reflection or refraction or by passing the light through a coloured filter.

The work is a vade mecum of the experimenter's art, displaying in many examples how to use observation to propose factual generalisations about the physical world and then exclude competing explanations by specific experimental tests. However, unlike the Principia, which vowed Non fingo hypotheses or "I make no hypotheses" outside the deductive method, the Opticks develops conjectures about light that go beyond the experimental evidence: for example, that the physical behaviour of light was due its "corpuscular" nature as small particles, or that perceived colours were harmonically proportioned like the tones of a diatonic musical scale.

The Queries

Opticks concludes with a set of "Queries." In the first edition, these were sixteen such Queries; that number was increased in the Latin edition, published in 1706, and then in the revised English edition, published in 1717/18. The first set of Queries were brief, but the later ones became short essays, filling many pages. In the fourth edition of 1730, there were 31 Queries, and it was the famous "31st Query" that, over the next two hundred years, stimulated a great deal of speculation and development on theories of chemical affinity.

These Queries, especially the later ones, deal with a wide range of physical phenomena, far transcending any narrow interpretation of the subject matter of "optics." They concern the nature and transmission of heat; the possible cause of gravity; electrical phenomena; the nature of chemical action; the way in which God created matter in "the Beginning;" the proper way to do science; and even the ethical conduct of human beings. These Queries are not really questions in the ordinary sense. They are almost all posed in the negative, as rhetorical questions. That is, Newton does not ask whether light "is" or "may be" a "body." Rather, he declares: "Is not Light a Body?" Not only does this form indicate that Newton had an answer, but that it may go on for many pages. Clearly, as Stephen Hales (a firm Newtonian of the early eighteenth century) declared, this was Newton's mode of explaining "by Query."

Reception
The Opticks was widely read and debated in England and on the Continent. The early presentation of the work to the Royal Society stimulated a bitter dispute between Newton and Robert Hooke over the "corpuscular" or particle theory of light, which prompted Newton to postpone publication of the work until after Hooke's death in 1703. On the Continent, and in France in particular, both the Principia and the Opticks were initially rejected by many natural philosophers, who continued to defend Cartesian natural philosophy and the Aristotelian version of color, and claimed to find Newton's prism experiments difficult to replicate. Indeed, the Aristotelian theory of the fundamental nature of white light was defended into the 19th century, for example by the German writer Johann Wolfgang von Goethe in his 1810 Zur Farbenlehre  (Theory of Colours).

Newtonian science became a central issue in the assault waged by the philosophes in the Age of Enlightenment against a natural philosophy based on the authority of ancient Greek or Roman naturalists or on deductive reasoning from first principles (the method advocated by French philosopher René Descartes), rather than on the application of mathematical reasoning to experience or experiment. Voltaire popularised Newtonian science, including the content of both the Principia and the Opticks, in his Elements de la philosophie de Newton (1738), and after about 1750 the combination of the experimental methods exemplified by the Opticks and the mathematical methods exemplified by the Principia were established as a unified and comprehensive model of Newtonian science. Some of the primary adepts in this new philosophy were such prominent figures as Benjamin Franklin, Antoine-Laurent Lavoisier, and James Black.

Subsequent to Newton, much has been amended. Thomas Young and Augustin-Jean Fresnel showed that the wave theory Christiaan Huygens described in his Treatise on Light (1690) could prove that colour is the visible manifestation of light's wavelength. Science also slowly came to recognize the difference between perception of colour and mathematisable optics. The German poet Goethe, with his epic diatribe Theory of Colours, could not shake the Newtonian foundation - but "one hole Goethe did find in Newton's armour.. Newton had committed himself to the doctrine that refraction without colour was impossible. He therefore thought that the object-glasses of telescopes must for ever remain imperfect, achromatism and refraction being incompatible. This inference was proved by Dollond to be wrong." (John Tyndall, 1880)

See also
 Color theory
 Luminiferous aether
 Prism (optics)
 Theory of Colours book
 Book of Optics (Ibn al-Haytham)
 Elements of the Philosophy of Newton (Voltaire)
 Multiple-prism dispersion theory

References 

Burnley, David The History of the English Language: A Source Book 2nd Edition, 2000, Pearson Education Limited.

External links

Full and free online editions of Newton's Opticks
 Rarebookroom, First edition
 ETH-Bibliothek, First edition
 Gallica, First edition
 Internet Archive, Fourth edition
 Internet Archive, Dover reprint, Fourth edition
 Cambridge University Digital Library, Papers on Hydrostatics, Optics, Sound and Heat – Manuscript papers by Isaac Newton containing draft of Opticks
 

1704 books
English non-fiction literature
Books by Isaac Newton
History of optics
1704 in science
Mathematics books
Physics books
Treatises